The 1981 Barrington Tops Cessna 210 disappearance relates to the mysterious disappearance of a Cessna 210 flying from Whitsunday Coast Airport to Bankstown Airport via Gold Coast Airport. The last known contact with the aircraft was in the Barrington Tops area. Nothing further was heard and no trace of the aircraft or its occupants has so far been found despite extensive searches.

Accident
VH-MDX was a Cessna 210 which disappeared in New South Wales, Australia in 1981. No trace of the aircraft, or occupants, has ever been found.

Background
VH-MDX was chartered by four Sydney workmates for a flight back from the Whitsunday Coast Airport on Sunday 9 August 1981. The men had been sailing in the Whitsunday Passage. MDX stopped to refuel at Gold Coast Airport near Coolangatta and took off again at 5:02 p.m. The pilot had submitted a flight plan following the coast to Taree thence inland via Craven and Singleton to Bankstown, a suburb of Sydney.

Disappearance
Shortly after passing waypoint CRAVN, the pilot reported excessive turbulence and downdraft, and that the aircraft's artificial horizon and gyroscopic direction indicator had failed. The aircraft's subsequent course is not clear, but the pilot reported ice accumulation and difficulty in gaining altitude.

Searches
There have been many air-based and ground-based searches since the disappearance. Technologies employed include satellite imagery, aerial photography, magnetometry and chemical sampling of water downstream from the search area.

References

External links
Search for Missing Aircraft VH-MDX

Aviation accidents and incidents in New South Wales
Hunter Region
Aviation accidents and incidents in 1981
1980s in New South Wales
Missing aircraft